Discovery High School is a public high school in Lawrenceville, Georgia and a part of Gwinnett County Public Schools.

It was built in 2015 for over $70 million. Its opening provided relief to over crowding at Central Gwinnett High School and Berkmar High School.

 it had 2,716 students. That year GCPS acquired land for the Discovery High park facilities using eminent domain.

References

External links
 Discovery High School

Public high schools in Georgia (U.S. state)
Schools in Gwinnett County, Georgia
2015 establishments in Georgia (U.S. state)
Educational institutions established in 2015